The Catholic Church in Laos and Cambodia, both former French colonies in Indochina (Southeast Asia), consists solely of an entirely missionary Latin hierarchy, which is joined in a single Episcopal conference of Laos and Cambodia (French acronym CELAC). There are only pre-diocesan jurisdictions (all exempt, i.e. not part of an ecclesiastical province but directly dependent on the Holy See and its missionary Roman Congregation Propaganda Fide), no single proper see yet :
 five Apostolic Vicariates, in Laos except one in Cambodia - only they are entitled to a titular bishop
 two Apostolic Prefectures, both in Cambodia.

There are no titular sees in either country. All defunct jurisdictions have current successors. Formally, there is an Apostolic Nunciature (embassy-level) to Cambodia and an Apostolic Delegation (lower level) to Laos, as papal diplomatic representations in both countries, but these offices are vested (like the Apostolic Delegation to Myanmar) in the Apostolic Nuncio to Thailand (in its capital Bangkok).

Current (Latin, exempt) jurisdictions in Cambodia 
 Apostolic Vicariate of Phnom Penh
 Apostolic Prefecture of Battambang
 Apostolic Prefecture of Kompong Cham

Current (Latin, exempt) jurisdictions in Laos 
 Apostolic Vicariate of Luang Prabang
 Apostolic Vicariate of Pakse
 Apostolic Vicariate of Savannakhet
 Apostolic Vicariate of Vientiane

Sources and references 
 GCatholic - CELAC
 GCatholic - Cambodia
 GCatholic - Laos

Laos and Cambodia
Roman Catholic dioceses in Cambodia
Roman Catholic dioceses in Laos
Catholic dioceses
Catholic dioceses